Carnival is the fifth extended play by the South Korean boy group B.A.P.  It was released on February 22, 2016 by TS Entertainment and distributed by LOEN Entertainment. It features the lead single "Feel So Good". It peaked at #2 on the Gaon Music Chart.

Track listing

References

2016 EPs
B.A.P (South Korean band) EPs
Kakao M EPs
TS Entertainment EPs